The Sanetti shrew or Bekele's shrew (Crocidura afeworkbekelei) is a species of mammal in the family Soricidae. It is endemic to Ethiopia.

Etymology 
Its specific epithet honors Ethiopian mammalogist Afework Bekele.

Distribution and habitat 
This species is thought to be endemic to the Bale Mountains of the Sanetti Plateau in southwestern Ethiopia. It inhabits the Afromontane zone with low and scattered vegetation, at about 4,000 meters above sea level.

Description 
The dorsal pelage is greyish-brown with the base of the hairs being gray, while the ventral pelage is gray with light yellowish tips. The back of the legs is light gray. The feet are slightly elongated. The tail, between 50.6 and 61.5% of the head-body length, is brown above, brownish-gray below and interspersed with long bristles.

Conservation status 
No threats have presently been documented for this species, and it is classified as Data Deficient on the IUCN Red List.

References 

Crocidura
Mammals of Ethiopia
Endemic fauna of Ethiopia
Mammals described in 2016